The Chinese Chess Championship is the annual individual national chess championship of China.  Following are the official winners of the national championship from 1957 to date.

Winners
{| class="sortable wikitable"
! Year !! Champion !! Women's Champion
|-
|	1957	||	Zhang Fujiang	||	
|-
|	1958	||	Xu Jialiang	||	
|-
|	1959	||	Deng Wenxiang	||	
|-
|	1960	||	Xu Tianli	||	
|-
|	1962	||	Xu Tianli	||	
|-
|	1962 (2)	||	??	||	
|-
|	1964	||	Jian Mingji	||	
|-
|	1965	||	Huang Xinzhai	||	
|-
|	1966	||	Zhang Donglu	||	
|-
|	1974	||	Chen De	||	
|-
|	1975	||	Qi Jingxuan	||	
|-
|	1977	||	Chen De	||	
|-
|	1978	||	Qi Jingxuan	||	
|-
|       1979	||	Li Zunian	||	Liu Shilan
|-
|	1979(2)	||	--	||	Liu Shilan
|-
|	1980	||	Liu Wenzhe	||	Liu Shilan
|-
|	1980(2)	||	--	||	Liu Shilan
|-
|	1981	||	Ye Jiangchuan	||	Liu Shilan
|-
|	1982	||	Liu Wenzhe	||	Zhao Lan
|-
|	1983	||	Xu Jun	||	Liu Shilan
|-
|	1984	||	Ye Jiangchuan	||	Liu Shilan
|-
|	1985	||	Xu Jun	||	Liu Shilan
|-
|	1986	||	Ye Jiangchuan	||	Liu Shilan
|-
|	1987	||	Ye Jiangchuan	||	Peng Zhaoqin
|-
|	1988	||	Wang Zili	||	Qin Kanying
|-
|	1989	||	Ye Jiangchuan	||	Xie Jun
|-
|	1990	||	Ye Rongguang	||	Peng Zhaoqin
|-
|	1991	||	Lin Weiguo	||	Qin Kanying
|-
|	1992	||	Lin Weiguo	||	Zhu Chen
|-
|	1993	||	Tong Yuanming	||	Peng Zhaoqin
|-
|	1994	||	Ye Jiangchuan	||	Zhu Chen
|-
|	1995	||	Liang Jinrong	||	Qin Kanying
|-
|	1996	||	Ye Jiangchuan	||	Zhu Chen
|-
|	1997	||	Lin Weiguo	||	Wang Lei
|-
|	1998	||	Peng Xiaomin	||	Wang Lei
|-
|	1999	||	Wang Zili	||	Qin Kanying
|-
|	2000	||	Liang Jinrong	||	Wang Lei
|-
|	2001	||	Zhang Zhong	||	Wang Lei
|-
|	2002	||	Zhang Pengxiang	||	Wang Pin
|-
|	2003	||	Zhang Zhong	||	Xu Yuanyuan
|-
|	2004	||	Bu Xiangzhi	||	Qin Kanying
|-
|	2005	||	Wang Yue	||	Wang Yu
|-
|	2006	||	Ni Hua	||	Li Ruofan
|-
|	2007	||	Ni Hua	||	Hou Yifan
|-
|	2008	||	Ni Hua	||	Hou Yifan
|-
|       2009    ||      Ding Liren  ||      Shen Yang
|-
|       2010    ||      Wang Hao  ||      Ju Wenjun
|-
|       2011    ||      Ding Liren  ||      Zhang Xiaowen
|-
|       2012    || Ding Liren       ||      Huang Qian
|-
|       2013    || Wang Yue       ||      Ding Yixin
|-
|       2014    || Yu Yangyi    ||       Ju Wenjun
|-
|-
|       2015    || Wei Yi           ||   Tan Zhongyi
|-
|       2016    || Wei Yi           ||  Guo Qi
|-
|       2017    || Wei Yi           || Lei Tingjie
|-
|       2018    || Wen Yang         || Zhai Mo
|-
|       2019    || Lu Shanglei         || Zhu Jiner
|}

Women's Crosstables

{| class="wikitable" style="text-align: center;"
|+ CHN-ch (Women) Xinghua Jiangsu 2012
!   !! Player !! Rating !! 1 !! 2 !! 3 !! 4 !! 5 !! 6 !! 7 !! 8 !! 9 !! 0 !! 1 !! 2 !! Points !! TB !! Perf. !! +/-
|-
| 1 || align=left||| 2399 ||* || ½ || 1 || ½ || ½ ||½ || ½ || 1  || 1 || 1 || ½ ||1 || 8 ||  40.00  || 2487 || + 14
|-
| 2 || align=left|     || 2354 || ½ ||* || ½ || ½ || ½ || ½ || 1 || 1 ||1 || ½ || 1 || 1 || 8 || 39 || 2492 || +21
|-
| 3 || align=left|     || 2557 || 0 ||½ ||* || ½ ||  1 || ½ || 1 || ½ || ½ || ½ || 1 || 1 || 7  || || 2401 || -17 
|-
| 4 || align=left|    || 2372 || ½ || ½ || ½ ||* ||½ || ½ || 0  || ½ || 1 || 1 || ½ || 1 ||6½  || 31.50 || 2383 || +3
|-
| 5 || align=left|  || 2351 || ½ || ½ || 0 || ½ ||* || ½ || 1 || ½ || 0 || 1 || 1 || 1 ||6½  || 31.50 || 2385 || +6
|-
| 6 || align=left|    || 2438 || ½ || ½ || ½ ||½ || ½ ||* || ½ || ½ || ½ || 1 || ½ || ½ || 6   || 32.00 || 2346 || -12
|-
| 7 || align=left|       || 2366 || ½ || 0 || 0 || 1 || 0 || ½ ||* || 0 || 1 || 1 || 1 ||1 ||6  || 26.00  || 2353 || -1 
|-
| 8 || align=left|   || 2350 || 0 || 0 || ½ || ½ || ½ || ½ || 1 ||* || 1 || ½ || ½ || ½ || 5½  ||      || 2322 || -4
|-
| 9 || align=left|    || 2053 ||0 || 0 || ½ || 0 || 1 ||½ || 0 || 0 ||* || ½ || ½ || 1 || 4  || 18.00 || 2251 || +22
|-
| 10 || align=left| ||2369  || 0 || ½ || ½ || 0 || 0 || 0 || 0 || ½ || ½ ||* || 1 || 1 || 4   || 16.75 || 2234 || -4
|-
| 11 || align=left|  || 2209 || ½ || 0 || 0 || ½ || 0 || ½ || 0 || ½ || ½ ||0 ||* || ½ || 3 ||      || 2165 || -7
|-
| 12 || align=left|     || 2186 || 0 || 0 || 0 || 0 || 0 || ½ || 0 || ½ || 0|| 0 || ½ ||* || 1½  ||      || 2017 || -19
|}

Average Elo: 2324 <=> Cat: 3

m = 6.60

{| class="wikitable" style="text-align: center;"
|+ CHN-ch (Women) Xinghua Jiangsu 2011
!   !! Player !! Rating !! 1 !! 2 !! 3 !! 4 !! 5 !! 6 !! 7 !! 8 !! 9 !! 0 !! 1 !! 2 !! Points !! TB !! Perf. !! +/-
|-
| 1 || align=left|||2344  ||* ||1 ||½ ||½ ||1 ||½ ||1 ||1 ||½ ||½ ||1 ||1 ||8½   ||      || 2598 || +36
|-
| 2 || align=left|     ||2495  ||0 ||* ||½ ||1 ||1 ||1 ||1 ||0 ||1 ||1 ||½ ||1 ||8  || || 2542 || +7
|-
| 3 || align=left|     ||2275  ||½ ||½ ||* ||½ ||0 ||0 ||1 ||½ ||1 ||1 ||½ ||1 ||6½  ||31.25||2456|| +27
|-
| 4 || align=left|    ||2398  ||½ ||0 ||½ ||* ||½ ||½ ||0 ||½ ||1 ||1 ||1 ||1 ||6½  ||29.25|| 2444 || +8
|-
| 5 || align=left|  ||2428  ||0 ||0 ||1 ||½ ||* ||0 ||1 ||½ ||½ ||1 ||1 ||1 ||6½  ||29.00|| 2442 || +3
|-
| 6 || align=left|    ||2519  ||½ ||0 ||1 ||½ ||1 ||* ||0 ||½ ||½ ||0 ||1 ||1 ||6   ||29.75      || 2402 || -16
|-
| 7 || align=left|       ||2331  ||0 ||0 ||0 ||1 ||0 ||1 ||* ||1 ||½ ||1 ||½ ||1 ||6  ||26.50      || 2418 || +13
|-
| 8 || align=left|   ||2394 ||0 ||1 ||½ ||½ ||½ ||½ ||0 ||* ||½ ||1 ||½ ||0 ||5   ||      || 2350 || -7
|-
| 9 || align=left|    ||2443  ||½ ||0 ||0 ||0 ||½ ||½ ||½ ||½ ||* ||0 ||1 || 1 ||4½  ||      || 2314 || -20
|-
| 10 || align=left| ||2369  ||½ ||0 ||0 ||0 ||0 ||1 ||0 ||0||1||* ||½ ||1 ||4   ||      || 2287 || -13
|-
| 11 || align=left|  ||2376  ||0 ||½ ||½ ||0 ||0 ||0 ||½ ||½ ||0 ||½ ||* ||1 ||3½   ||      || 2251 || -19
|-
| 12 || align=left|     ||2217  ||0 ||0 ||0 ||0 ||0 ||0 ||0 ||1 ||0||0 ||0 ||* ||1   ||      || 1998 || -20
|}

Average Elo: 2382 <=> Cat: 6

m = 6.60

{| class="wikitable" style="text-align: center;"
|+ CHN-ch (Women) Xinghua 2010
!   !! Player !! Rating !! 1 !! 2 !! 3 !! 4 !! 5 !! 6 !! 7 !! 8 !! 9 !! 0 !! 1 !! 2 !! Points !! TB !! Perf. !! +/-
|-
| 1 || align=left|||2500  ||* ||½ ||0 ||½ ||1 ||½ ||1 ||1 ||½ ||1 ||1 ||1 ||8   ||      || 2531 || +6
|-
| 2 || align=left|     ||2437  ||½ ||* ||0 ||½ ||1 ||1 ||½ ||1 ||½||½ ||1 ||1 ||7½  || || 2499 || +10
|-
| 3 || align=left|     ||2464 ||1 ||1 ||* ||0 ||0 ||½||1 ||0 ||1 ||½ ||1 ||1 ||7  ||||2462|| +1
|-
| 4 || align=left|    ||2337  ||½ ||½ ||1 ||* ||½ ||½ ||½ ||½ ||1 ||½ ||½ ||½ ||6½  |||| 2439 || +16
|-
| 5 || align=left|  ||2327  ||0 ||0 ||1 ||½ ||* ||0 ||0 ||1 ||½ ||1 ||1 ||1 ||6  |||| 2408 || +12
|-
| 6 || align=left|    ||2493  ||½ ||0 ||½ ||½ ||1 ||* ||0 ||0 ||0 ||1 ||1 ||1 ||5½   |||| 2362 || -18
|-
| 7 || align=left|       ||2180  ||0 ||½ ||0 ||½||1 ||1 ||* ||1 ||½ ||0 ||0 ||1 ||5  ||27.25|| 2358 || +23
|-
| 8 || align=left|   ||2426 ||0 ||0 ||1 ||½ ||0 ||1 ||0 ||* ||0 ||1 ||1 ||½ ||5   ||25.25      || 2337 || -13
|-
| 9 || align=left|    ||2361  ||½ ||½ ||0 ||0 ||½ ||1 ||½ ||1 ||* ||0 ||0 ||½ ||4½  ||25.25      || 2310 || -8
|-
| 10 || align=left| ||2452  ||0 ||½ ||½ ||½ ||0 ||0 ||1 ||0||1||* ||½ ||½ ||4½   ||23.25      || 2302 || -22
|-
| 11 || align=left|  ||2216  ||0 ||0 ||0 ||½ ||0 ||0 ||1 ||0 ||1 ||½ ||* ||½ ||3½   ||      || 2254 || +4
|-
| 12 || align=left|     ||2280  ||0 ||0 ||0 ||½||0 ||0 ||½ ||½ ||½||½ ||½ ||* ||3   ||      || 2211 || -10
|}

Average Elo: 2372 <=> Cat: 5

m = 7.04

{| class="wikitable" style="text-align: center;"
|+ CHN-ch (Women) Xinghua Jiangsu 2009
!   !! Player !! Rating !! 1 !! 2 !! 3 !! 4 !! 5 !! 6 !! 7 !! 8 !! 9 !! 0 !! 1 !! 2 !! Points !! TB !! Perf. !! +/-
|-
| 1 || align=left|||2420  ||* ||½ ||½ ||1 ||½ ||½ ||1 ||1 ||1 ||1 ||1 ||1 ||9   ||      || 2600 || +23
|-
| 2 || align=left|     ||2531 ||½ ||* ||1 ||1 ||0 ||½ ||½ ||1 ||1||1 ||1 ||1 ||8½  || || 2542 || +2
|-
| 3 || align=left|     ||2436 ||½ ||0 ||* ||1 ||½ ||1||1 ||½ ||1 ||1 ||1 ||1 ||8  ||||2508|| +11
|-
| 4 || align=left|    ||2340  ||0 ||0 ||½ ||* ||1||½ ||1 ||0 ||1 ||1 ||1 ||1 ||7  |||| 2444 || +16
|-
| 5 || align=left|  ||2364  ||½ ||1 ||0 ||0 ||* ||1 ||½ ||½ ||½ ||1 ||1 ||½ ||6½  ||32.00|| 2408 || +7
|-
| 6 || align=left|    ||2454  ||½ ||½ ||½ ||½ ||0 ||* ||½ ||½ ||½ ||1 ||1 ||1 ||6½   ||29.25|| 2401 || -7
|-
| 7 || align=left|       ||2336  ||0 ||½ ||0 ||0||½ ||½ ||* ||1 ||1 ||½ ||1 ||1 ||6  |||| 2378 || +7
|-
| 8 || align=left|   ||2281 ||0 ||0 ||0 ||1 ||½ ||½ ||0 ||* ||1 ||½ ||1 ||1 ||5½   |||| 2352 || +10
|-
| 9 || align=left|    ||2265  ||0 ||0 ||½ ||0 ||½ ||½ ||0 ||0 ||* ||½ ||½ ||1 ||3½  |||| 2222 || -7
|-
| 10 || align=left| ||2335  ||0 ||0 ||0 ||0 ||0 ||0 ||½ ||½||½||* ||½ ||½ ||2½   |||| 2135 || -28
|-
| 11 || align=left|  ||2231  ||0 ||0 ||0 ||0 ||0 ||0 ||0 ||0 ||½ ||½ ||* ||1 ||2   ||      || 2096 || -17
|-
| 12 || align=left|     ||2162  ||0 ||0 ||0 ||0||½ ||0 ||0 ||0 ||0||½ ||0 ||* ||1   ||      || 1963 || -18
|}

Average Elo: 2346 <=> Cat: 4

{| class="wikitable" style="text-align: center;"
|+ CHN-ch (Women) Beijing 2008
!   !! Player !! Rating !! 1 !! 2 !! 3 !! 4 !! 5 !! 6 !! 7 !! 8 !! 9 !! 0 !! 1 !! 2 !! Points !! TB !! Perf. !! +/-
|-
| 1 || align=left|||2549  ||* ||½ ||½ ||½ ||½ ||1 ||1 ||1 ||1 ||1 ||1 ||1 ||9   ||      || 2598 || +7
|-
| 2 || align=left|     ||2523 ||½ ||* ||0 ||1 ||1 ||1 ||0 ||½ ||½||1 ||1 ||1 ||7½  || || 2473 || -5
|-
| 3 || align=left|     ||2439 ||½ ||1 ||* ||½ ||½ ||½||1 ||1 ||1 ||0 ||0 ||1 ||7  ||||2444|| +2
|-
| 4 || align=left|    ||2361  ||½ ||0 ||½ ||* ||½||1 ||0 ||0 ||1 ||1 ||½ ||1 ||6  |||| 2386 || +4
|-
| 5 || align=left|  ||2374  ||½ ||0 ||½ ||½ ||* ||0 ||½ ||1 ||½ ||½ ||1 ||½ ||5½  ||28.50|| 2354 || -3
|-
| 6 || align=left|    ||2225  ||0 ||0 ||½ ||0 ||1 ||* ||1 ||1 ||0 ||1 ||½ ||½ ||5½   || 26.75 || 2367 || +20
|-
| 7 || align=left|       ||2361  ||0 ||1 ||0 ||1||½ ||0 ||* ||0 ||½ ||1 ||½ ||1 ||5½  ||26.25|| 2355 || -1
|-
| 8 || align=left|   ||2353 ||0 ||½ ||0 ||1 ||0 ||0 ||1 ||* ||½ ||½ ||1 ||1 ||5½   ||25.25|| 2355 || 0
|-
| 9 || align=left|    ||2387  ||0 ||½ ||0 ||0 ||½ ||1 ||½ ||½ ||* ||½ ||½ ||1 ||5  |||| 2321 || -10
|-
| 10 || align=left| ||2292  ||0 ||0 ||1 ||0 ||½ ||0 ||0 ||½||½||* ||1 ||½ ||4   ||19.75|| 2264 || -5
|-
| 11 || align=left|  ||2188  ||0 ||0 ||1 ||½ ||0 ||½ ||½ ||0 ||½ ||0 ||* ||1 ||4   ||19.50      || 2273 || +10
|-
| 12 || align=left|     ||2211  ||0 ||0 ||0 ||0||½ ||½ ||0 ||0 ||0||½ ||0 ||* ||1½   ||      || 2048 || -18
|}

Average Elo: 2355 <=> Cat: 5

m = 7.04

{| class="wikitable" style="text-align: center;"
|+ CHN-ch (Women) Wuxi 2006
!   !! Player !! Rating !! 1 !! 2 !! 3 !! 4 !! 5 !! 6 !! 7 !! 8 !! 9 !! 0 !! 1 !! 2 !! Points !! TB !! Perf. !! +/-
|-
| 1 || align=left|    ||2391  ||* ||½ ||½ ||½ ||½ ||1 ||1 ||½ ||1 ||1 ||1 ||1 ||8½  ||     || 2579 || +26
|-
| 2 || align=left|     ||2393 ||½ ||* ||½ ||1 ||½ ||1 ||½ ||½ ||½||½ ||1 ||1 ||7½   ||     || 2499 || +16
|-
| 3 || align=left|    ||2423 ||½ ||½ ||* ||1 ||0 ||½||½ ||1 ||1 ||1 ||1 ||0 ||7    ||     ||2461|| +6
|-
| 4 || align=left|||2298  ||½ ||0 ||0 ||* ||1||1 ||½ ||1 ||½ ||½ ||1 ||1 ||7   ||     || 2472 || +27
|-
| 5 || align=left|    ||2370  ||½ ||½||1 ||0 ||* ||0 ||½ ||½||½ ||½ ||½ ||1 ||5½ ||28.50|| 2369 || 0
|-
| 6 || align=left|  ||2371  ||0 ||0 ||½ ||0 ||1 ||* ||1 || ||1 ||1 ||½ ||½ ||5½  ||26.75|| 2369 || 0
|-
| 7 || align=left|  ||2391  ||0 ||½ ||½ ||½||½ ||0 ||* ||½||½ ||½ ||1 ||1 ||5½  ||26.25|| 2367 || -4
|-
| 8 || align=left|  ||2330 ||½ ||½ ||0 ||0 ||½ ||1 ||½ ||* ||0 ||½ ||½ ||1 ||5  ||25.25|| 2340 || +2
|-
| 9 || align=left|    ||2411  ||0 ||½ ||0 ||½ ||½ ||0 ||½ ||1 ||* ||½ ||½ ||1 ||5  |||| 2334 || -12
|-
| 10 || align=left|  ||2390  ||0 ||½ ||0 ||½ ||½ ||0 ||½ ||½||½||* ||½ ||½ ||4    ||19.75|| 2270 || -19
|-
| 11 || align=left|     ||2303  ||0 ||0 ||0 ||0 ||½ ||½ ||0 ||½ ||½ ||½ ||* ||½ ||3  ||19.50|| 2205 || -14
|-
| 12 || align=left|||2355  ||0 ||0 ||1 ||0||0 ||½ ||0 ||0 ||0||½ ||½ ||* ||2½   ||     || 2158 || -28
|}

Average Elo: 2368 <=> Cat: 5

m = 7.04

See also
Chess in China

References
 List of winners 1957-2004: 
 Details of the 2005 edition: , 
 Details of the 2006 edition from TWIC: 
 Details of the 2007 edition: 
 Details of the 2008 edition: 
 Several biographies of Chinese champions from Chessbase: 
 16-year-old Ding Liren wins Chinese championship 
 2011 Chinese Championship: Ding Liren and Zhang Xiaowen win!
 Chinese Championships 2011

External links
 https://web.archive.org/web/20100604062707/http://chess.sport.org.cn/CICC/index.html - official website

Chess national championships
Women's chess national championships
Championship
Chess